The 2021–22 North Carolina Tar Heels women's basketball team represented the University of North Carolina at Chapel Hill for the 2021–22 NCAA Division I women's basketball season. The Tar Heels were led by head coach Courtney Banghart, who was in her third season as head coach. She was assisted by Joanne Aluka-White, Adrian Walters, and former Clemson head coach Itoro Coleman. The Tar Heels played their home games at Carmichael Arena as members of the Atlantic Coast Conference.

The Tar Heels finished the season 25–7 overall and 13–5 in ACC play, to finish in a three way tie for third place.  As the fourth seed in the ACC tournament, they lost to fifth seed Virginia Tech in the Quarterfinals.  They earned an at-large bid to the  NCAA tournament and were the fifth seed in the Greensboro Region.  They defeated twelfth seed Stephen F. Austin in the First Round and fourth seed Arizona in the Second Round before falling to top seed South Carolina in the Sweet Sixteen to end their season.

Previous season
For the 2020–21 season, the Tar Heels finished 13–11 and 8–9 in the ACC, finishing eighth in regular season play. The Tar Heels were the eight seed in the ACC tournament, where they lost to Wake Forest in the Second Round.  The Tar Heels earned an at-large bid to the  NCAA tournament that was held in San Antonio, TX. As the ten seed in the HemisFair Region, they faced seventh seeded Alabama, losing 80–71 in the first round of the tournament.

Off-Season

Departures

Incoming transfers

Recruiting Class
Source:

Roster

Schedule and results

Source

|-
!colspan=6 style="background:#56A0D3; color:#FFFFFF;"| Regular Season

|-
!colspan=6 style="background:#56A0D3; color:#FFFFFF;"| ACC Tournament

|-
!colspan=9 style="background:#56A0D3;"| NCAA Women's Tournament

Rankings

See also
2021-22 North Carolina Tar Heels men's basketball team

References

2021–22 Atlantic Coast Conference women's basketball season
North Carolina Tar Heels women's basketball seasons
North Carolina Tar Heels women's basketball team
North Carolina Tar Heels women's basketball team
North Carolina